Beatriz García Vidagany (born 17 November 1988) is a retired Spanish tennis player.

She reached career-high WTA rankings of 146 in singles on 5 July 2010, and 148 in doubles on 23 March 2015. In her career, García Vidagany won two singles titles and four doubles titles on the ITF Circuit.

Career
At the 2010 Andalucia Tennis Experience, she achieved her first win over a top-100 player (No. 87 Kristina Barrois) and first WTA Tour main-draw win in her career. In her next round, she beat world No. 10, Kim Clijsters, 7–5, 4–6, 6–4 for her first ever top-ten win.

She retired from the professional tour in December 2015 due to persistent injuries.

ITF Circuit finals

Singles: 7 (2–5)

Doubles: 11 (4–7)

References

External links

 
 

1988 births
Living people
Sportspeople from Valencia
Spanish female tennis players
Tennis players from the Valencian Community